Sean Kehoe is a former award-winning and Grey Cup champion fullback in the Canadian Football League.

Born in Edmonton, Alberta, Kehoe joined his hometown Edmonton Eskimos in 1981 and was part of the last two Grey Cup victories of that great dynasty. He moved to the Winnipeg Blue Bombers in 1983. In 1984 he  won the Grey Cup again and was named the Dick Suderman Trophy winner (rushing for 89 yards.) His two best seasons were 1985, when he caught 54 passes for 513 yards, and 1986 when he snagged another 45 for 440 yards. Over six seasons he rushed for 571 yards, caught 156 passes for 1482 yards, and scored 8 touchdowns.

References

1958 births
Living people
Canadian football people from Edmonton
Canadian football running backs
Players of Canadian football from Alberta
Winnipeg Blue Bombers players
Edmonton Elks players
University of Alberta alumni
Alberta Golden Bears football players